The 1980 South Dakota Coyotes football team represented the University of South Dakota as a member of the North Central Conference (NCC) during the 1980 NCAA Division II football season. Led by second-year head coach Dave Triplett, the Coyotes compiled an overall record of 5–6 with a mark of 3–3–1 in conference play, placing fifth in the NCC. South Dakota and  split two head-to-head games, which counted as a tie for each team in the conference standings.

Schedule

References 

South Dakota
South Dakota Coyotes football seasons
South Dakota Coyotes football